Hadley Bourne is a grade II listed building in Dury Road, Monken Hadley, England.

References

External links

Grade II listed buildings in the London Borough of Barnet
Houses in the London Borough of Barnet
Monken Hadley